Gelora Brawijaya Stadium is a stadium in Surabaya. It was the home base of Persebaya Surabaya, until the opening of Gelora 10 November Stadium which had more capacity and modern in functionity.

References

Football venues in Surabaya